Haemaphlebiella formona is a moth of the family Erebidae. It was described by William Schaus in 1905. It is found in French Guiana, Guyana, Amazonas and on Cuba.

References

Phaegopterina
Moths of South America
Moths of Cuba
Moths described in 1905